The Sinking of Petrel occurred in July 1861 during the American Civil War. While cruising off the coast of South Carolina the United States Navy warship  encountered a Confederate privateer named Petrel. The engagement ended in a Union victory and the surviving Confederates were arrested for piracy.

Background
USS St. Lawrence was a sailing frigate built for the Mexican War, she displaced  and was armed with fifty guns. Captain Hugh Y. Purviance was placed in command with orders to proceed south along the coast for service with the North Atlantic Blockading Squadron. Her opponent, Petrel, was a much smaller schooner-rigged vessel, mounting only two guns and under the command of Captain William Perry. She was formerly the United States Revenue Cutter Service ship William Aiken until being captured by the Confederates. Petrel had a very short career before she was destroyed, having been commissioned at Charleston, South Carolina on July 10, with seven other vessels. Petrel had a crew of fewer than fifty crewmen while St. Lawrence carried nearly 500 into battle, she left Charleston on July 28 and was discovered on the same date. It was night on July 28 when lookouts informed Captain Purviance that they had sighted a ship flying British colors off the South Carolina coast. Though the Union men did not know it at the time, the ship they saw was Petrel.

Sinking
A chase began and continued for around four hours before the Confederates were overhauled. Some accounts say USS St. Lawrence was disguised as a merchantman during the engagement which successfully lured Petrel in for an attack, but at some point Captain Perry discovered the true nature of the Union frigate and he decided to flee as fast as he could. When it became apparent that an escape was impossible, the privateer raised their naval jack and opened fire on St. Lawrence with the 32-pounder gun. After three shots the Union sailors responded with a salvo from their forecastle battery and hit the schooner twice in the hull. For about twenty minutes the two sides exchanged fire until Perry gave the order enter lifeboats and abandon ship. Thirty minutes later Petrel was completely underwater with multiple shot-holes through her side. USS St. Lawrence received some damage to her sails and rigging, though it was only slight and the ship was easily repaired, at least one man suffered from minor wounds. Thirty-six Confederates were taken prisoner and another four men went down with their vessel. The surviving Confederate sailors were eventually sent to Philadelphia in the steamship  to be charged for piracy but the accusation was not justified and the sailors were taken to Moyamensing Prison for the duration of the war.

See also
Action off Galveston Light
Battle of Cherbourg (1864)
Bahia Incident
Single ship action
James Henry Gillis
Frederick Pearson (Alaska)

References

Naval battles of the American Civil War
Union victories of the American Civil War
History of South Carolina
Charleston County, South Carolina
Battles of the Lower Seaboard Theater and Gulf Approach of the American Civil War
Shipwrecks of the American Civil War
1861 in South Carolina
Battles of the American Civil War in South Carolina
July 1861 events